Zamora is a canton in the Zamora-Chinchipe Province of Ecuador. It was named after Zamora city, the provincial capital and head of the canton of the same name.

History
On October 11, 1911, the Zamora Canton was created in the great former Provincia de Oriente, later in 1921 it became part of the Santiago-Zamora Province and in 1953, it permanently became part of the actual province.

General information
The canton is known for being one of the oldest and the largest canton in area of the province. It is surrounded by the remaining cantons, with exception of the Chinchipe, El Pangui and Paquisha cantons.  To the west the canton borders with the Loja Province. 

The Zamora Canton is the entrance from the Sierra Region towards the rest of the province by the Troncal Amazónica Highway, in a stretch of 62 kilometers from Loja city.

Political division

The canton is divided in 7 parishes, to wit: 

Cumbaratza
Guadalupe
El Limón
Imbana
Sabanilla
San Carlos
Timbara
Zamora

Cantons of Zamora-Chinchipe Province